Kathrin Goeken (born 24 December 1979) is a visually impaired Dutch Paralympic cyclist. She represented the Netherlands at the 2012 Summer Paralympics held in London, United Kingdom and she won one gold medal and one bronze medal.

Together with her pilot Kim van Dijk, she won the gold medal in the women's road time trial B event and the bronze medal in the women's road race B event.

In 2012, she also received the Order of Orange-Nassau decoration.

References

External links 
 

Living people
1979 births
Place of birth missing (living people)
Cyclists at the 2012 Summer Paralympics
Medalists at the 2012 Summer Paralympics
Paralympic gold medalists for the Netherlands
Paralympic bronze medalists for the Netherlands
Paralympic medalists in cycling
Recipients of the Order of Orange-Nassau
Dutch female cyclists
Paralympic cyclists with a vision impairment
Paralympic cyclists of the Netherlands
Sportspeople from Eindhoven
Cyclists from North Brabant
21st-century Dutch women
Dutch blind people